In mathematical optimization, the Karush–Kuhn–Tucker (KKT) conditions, also known as the Kuhn–Tucker conditions, are first derivative tests (sometimes called first-order necessary conditions) for a solution in nonlinear programming to be optimal, provided that some regularity conditions are satisfied.

Allowing inequality constraints, the KKT approach to nonlinear programming generalizes the method of Lagrange multipliers, which allows only equality constraints. Similar to the Lagrange approach, the constrained maximization (minimization) problem is rewritten as a Lagrange function whose optimal point is a saddle point, i.e. a global maximum (minimum) over the domain of the choice variables and a global minimum (maximum) over the multipliers, which is why the Karush–Kuhn–Tucker theorem is sometimes referred to as the saddle-point theorem.

The KKT conditions were originally named after Harold W. Kuhn and Albert W. Tucker, who first published the conditions in 1951. Later scholars discovered that the necessary conditions for this problem had been stated by William Karush in his  master's thesis in 1939.

Nonlinear optimization problem 

Consider the following nonlinear minimization or maximization problem:

optimize 
subject to

Corresponding to the constrained optimization problem one can form the Lagrangian function

where , . The Karush–Kuhn–Tucker theorem then states the following.

Theorem.

Since the idea of this approach is to find a supporting hyperplane on the feasible set , the proof of the Karush–Kuhn–Tucker theorem makes use of the hyperplane separation theorem.

The system of equations and inequalities corresponding to the KKT conditions is usually not solved directly, except in the few special cases where a closed-form solution can be derived analytically. In general, many optimization algorithms can be interpreted as methods for numerically solving the KKT system of equations and inequalities.

Necessary conditions 

Suppose that the objective function  and the constraint functions  and  have subderivatives at a point .

Stationarity
For minimizing : 
For maximizing : 
Primal feasibility

Dual feasibility

Complementary slackness

The last condition is sometimes written in the equivalent form: 

In the particular case , i.e., when there are no inequality constraints, the KKT conditions turn into the Lagrange conditions, and the KKT multipliers are called Lagrange multipliers.

Note on subdifferentials 
Note that even if  is differentiable, its subdifferential does not necessarily need to be .

and otherwise, .

Proof

Interpretation: KKT conditions as balancing constraint-forces in state space 

  is a potential field that the particle is minimizing.
  are one-sided constraint surfaces. The particle is allowed to move inside , but whenever it touches , it is pushed inwards.
  are two-sided constraint surfaces. The particle is allowed to move only on the surface .

Dual slackness states that if , then the  force must be zero, since the particle is not on the boundary, the one-sided constraint force cannot activate.

Matrix representation 

The necessary conditions can be written with Jacobian matrices of the constraint functions. Then the necessary conditions can be written as:

Stationarity
For maximizing : 
For minimizing : 

Primal feasibility

Dual feasibility

Complementary slackness

Regularity conditions (or constraint qualifications) 
One can ask whether a minimizer point  of the original, constrained optimization problem (assuming one exists) has to satisfy the above KKT conditions. This is similar to asking under what conditions the minimizer  of a function  in an unconstrained problem has to satisfy the condition . For the constrained case, the situation is more complicated, and one can state a variety of (increasingly complicated) "regularity" conditions under which a constrained minimizer also satisfies the KKT conditions. Some common examples for conditions that guarantee this are tabulated in the following, with the LICQ the most frequently used one:

The strict implications can be shown

 LICQ ⇒ MFCQ ⇒ CPLD ⇒ QNCQ

and

 LICQ ⇒ CRCQ ⇒ CPLD ⇒ QNCQ

In practice weaker constraint qualifications are preferred since they apply to a broader selection of problems.

Sufficient conditions 

In some cases, the necessary conditions are also sufficient for optimality. In general, the necessary conditions are not sufficient for optimality and additional information is required, such as the Second Order Sufficient Conditions (SOSC). For smooth functions, SOSC involve the second derivatives, which explains its name.

The necessary conditions are sufficient for optimality if the objective function  of a maximization problem is a concave function, the inequality constraints  are continuously differentiable convex functions and the equality constraints  are affine functions. Similarly, if the objective function  of a minimization problem is a convex function, the necessary conditions are also sufficient for optimality.

It was shown by Martin in 1985 that the broader class of functions in which KKT conditions guarantees global optimality are the so-called Type 1 invex functions.

Second-order sufficient conditions 

For smooth, non-linear optimization problems, a second order sufficient condition is given as follows.

The solution  found in the above section is a constrained local minimum if for the Lagrangian,

then,

where  is a vector satisfying the following,

where only those active inequality constraints  corresponding to strict complementarity (i.e. where ) are applied. The solution is a strict constrained local minimum in the case the inequality is also strict.

If , the third order Taylor expansion of the Lagrangian should be used to verify if  is a local minimum.

Economics 

Often in mathematical economics the KKT approach is used in theoretical models in order to obtain qualitative results. For example, consider a firm that maximizes its sales revenue subject to a minimum profit constraint. Letting  be the quantity of output produced (to be chosen),  be sales revenue with a positive first derivative and with a zero value at zero output,  be production costs with a positive first derivative and with a non-negative value at zero output, and  be the positive minimal acceptable level of profit, then the problem is a meaningful one if the revenue function levels off so it eventually is less steep than the cost function.  The problem expressed in the previously given minimization form is

Minimize  
subject to 
 

and the KKT conditions are

 

Since  would violate the minimum profit constraint, we have  and hence the third condition implies that the first condition holds with equality. Solving that equality gives

Value function 
If we reconsider the optimization problem as a maximization problem with constant inequality constraints:

The value function is defined as

Given this definition, each coefficient  is the rate at which the value function  increases as  increases.  Thus if each  is interpreted as a resource constraint, the coefficients tell you how much increasing a resource will increase the optimum value of our function .  This interpretation is especially important in economics and is used, for instance, in utility maximization problems.

Generalizations 

With an extra multiplier , which may be zero (as long as ), in front of  the KKT stationarity conditions turn into

 

which are called the Fritz John conditions. This optimality conditions holds without constraint qualifications and it is equivalent to the optimality condition KKT or (not-MFCQ).

The KKT conditions belong to a wider class of the first-order necessary conditions (FONC), which allow for non-smooth functions using subderivatives.

See also 
 Farkas' lemma
 Lagrange multiplier
 The Big M method, for linear problems, which extends the simplex algorithm to problems that contain "greater-than" constraints.
 Interior-point method a method to solve the KKT conditions.
 Slack variable

References

Further reading

External links 
Karush–Kuhn–Tucker conditions with derivation and examples
Examples and Tutorials on the KKT Conditions

Mathematical optimization
Mathematical economics